The Guns of Will Sonnett is a Western television series set in the 1870s that was broadcast in color on the ABC television network from 1967 to 1969. The series, which began with the working title, "Two Rode West", was the first production collaboration between Aaron Spelling and Danny Thomas, who would later go on to produce The Mod Squad. The series is distributed by CBS Television Distribution (under the moniker KWP Studios) and, when telecast, is usually seen in tandem with another 1960s short-lived Western series, the Mark Goodson-Bill Todman production Branded; King World was originally responsible for distributing both shows.

It was filmed on location at various sites near Los Angeles, including Wildwood Regional Park in Thousand Oaks, California.

Synopsis
The series starred veteran character actor Walter Brennan as Will Sonnett, and Dack Rambo as his grandson, Jeff, who were searching for Will's son, James.  Disgusted with his father's absence due to army business, James had disappeared at the age of seventeen. A few years later, a baby boy was delivered to Will, with a letter identifying him as James' son and explaining that the mother had died in childbirth. The letter also said that James was giving his father a second chance at being a parent. Will was grateful for the opportunity, and did his best to steer his grandson in the right direction.

The elder Sonnett was capable with firearms and often spoke to strangers about this in an intimidating way.  In the first episode, he mentions that his son is an expert with guns, and his grandson is better, "and I'm better than both of 'em – no brag, just fact."  This last phrase was uttered frequently on the show, and became a catch phrase among the show's fans.

Will was not completely absent from James' childhood, and he had taught James how to handle a six-shooter; the younger man became renowned as a peerless gunfighter.  Hearing so much of his father's repute, Jeff decided to find him.  Will agreed, and they rode across the West looking for James. They often arrived at places that James had recently left, where the people they met had mixed opinions of James.  Some saw him as a ruthless killer, while others viewed him as the only man brave enough to take the side of justice against men far more ruthless.

James, played by Jason Evers, appeared in a total of fourteen episodes.  Sometimes he was seen only fleetingly, or in a flashback or dream sequence; sometimes he had a more substantial role.  Although the Sonnets would come close to actually reuniting with James on several occasions, fate and circumstance would conspire to keep them apart until the very end of the series run.

The main characters achieved the goal of the premise in the final episode, when Will and Jeff located James. The three men became lawmen in a small town: Will as town marshal and the other two as his deputies.

The Guns of Will Sonnett aired two years after the cancellation of Brennan's 1964-1965 ABC series The Tycoon.

Regular cast
Walter Brennan as Will Sonnett
Dack Rambo as Jeff Sonnett, adult grandson of Will and son of James

In the season one episode The Favor, Will Sonnett is described by a former trading post merchant as having worked over 20 years earlier at Fort Turney as "one of the greatest scouts the Army ever had."

Recurring characters
Jason Evers as James Sonnett, also referred to as Jim Sonnett, both in episode dialogue and the opening narration: "We search for a man named Jim Sonnett."

Guest stars

Guest performers included future Academy Award winners Cloris Leachman and Jack Nicholson and three past and future Academy Award nominees Joan Blondell, Ellen Corby (1949), and Dennis Hopper.

Production

Development
The series was created by Richard Carr (as Dick Carr) and Aaron Spelling. Carr also wrote numerous episodes. Spelling was producer, Danny Thomas executive producer and Andrew Brennan, Walter's son, was associate producer. The onscreen closing credit describes it as a "Thomas-Spelling-Brenco Production."

Carr adapted the character of Will Sonnett from the lead character he created over a decade earlier for a stand-alone episode of the half-hour 1950s anthology TV series Four Star Playhouse. In the November 3, 1955 episode A Spray of Bullets, story and screenplay by Carr, actor Dick Powell plays "Will Sonnett," an aging, recently retired sheriff with a reputation for a fast draw but now with distance vision problems who visits a town in need of glasses from an eye doctor and is eventually called out in a blurry street duel with a gunfighter who has learned of his poor eyesight and wants to increase his own fame by killing the famous Sonnett. The gunfighter is played by Robert J. Wilke, who would later play villains in two The Guns of Will Sonnett episodes: The Hero and Meeting in a Small Town. A recurring theme in both productions is that the name "Sonnett" is considered famous, as when Powell's Sonnett rides into town in the opening, signs in at a hotel, and the clerk (or a bystander in other instances in the later series) instantly recognizes the name Sonnett, a scene used a number of times in the series, including its first episode.

The series was filmed at Desilu Studios (later renamed Paramount Studios) and on-location wilderness exteriors. Several episodes featured cave exteriors and interiors, which were filmed at Bronson Canyon in Los Angeles.

The accordion-and-guitar combo opening theme music was composed by Earle Hagen and Hugo Friedhofer.

Aftermath
In 1970, series creators Dick Carr and Aaron Spelling worked again with Walter Brennan on the western made-for-TV movie sequel The Over-the-Hill Gang Rides Again. It was written by Carr and produced by Thomas-Spelling Productions.

Episodes

Season 1 (1967–68)

Season 2 (1968–69)

Home media
Timeless Media Group released both seasons on DVD in Region 1 on July 14, 2009 in a 5-disc set entitled The Guns of Will Sonnett: The Complete Seasons 1&2. The episodes were taken from prints syndicated by King World, edited from the original broadcast versions, with 3 minutes missing from each episode. They are transferred from video tape sources and have not been remastered from the original film prints.

References

Brooks, Tim and Marsh, Earle, The Complete Directory to Prime Time Network and Cable TV Shows

External links

 

Guns of Will Sonnett, The
Guns of Will Sonnett, The
Guns of Will Sonnett, The
Guns of Will Sonnett, The
Guns of Will Sonnett, The
Guns of Will Sonnett, The
English-language television shows
Television series created by Aaron Spelling
Television series set in the 1870s